Chrysothamnus viscidiflorus is a species of shrub in the family Asteraceae of the Americas known by the common names yellow rabbitbrush and green rabbitbrush.

Description 
The leaves are up to a few centimeters long and may be thin and thread-like or up to 1 cm wide and oblong. They are glandular, resinous, and sticky.

The inflorescence is a bushy cluster of flower heads, each head 0.5–1 cm long. The flower head is lined with sticky yellow-green phyllaries and contains several yellowish protruding flowers.

The fruit is a hairy achene a few millimeters long with a wispy pappus at the tip. The species grows in sagebrush and woodland habitat.

Subspecies and varieties 
Subspecies and varieties include:
 Chrysothamnus viscidiflorus subsp. axillaris (D.D.Keck) L.C.Anderson — desert slopes in Arizona, California, Colorado, Nevada, Utah
 Chrysothamnus viscidiflorus subsp. lanceolatus (Nutt.) H.M.Hall & Clem. — Pennington County in South Dakota
 Chrysothamnus viscidiflorus subsp. planifolius L.C.Anderson — Arizona
 Chrysothamnus viscidiflorus subsp. puberulus (D.C.Eaton) H.M.Hall & Clem. — alpine zones in Arizona, California, Idaho, Nevada, Oregon, Utah
 Chrysothamnus viscidiflorus subsp. viscidiflorus  — alpine talus in most of the species range
Chrysothamnus viscidiflorus var. latifolius
 Chrysothamnus viscidiflorus var. serrulatus (Torr.) Greene — Utah, Nevada
Chrysothamnus viscidiflorus var. stenophyllus
Chrysothamnus viscidiflorus var. viscidiflorus

Chemistry 
Chrysothamnus viscidiflorus contains an unusual m-hydroxyacetophenone derivative, named viscidone, and chromanone derivatives.

Distribution and habitat 
The plant is widespread across of North American in much of the western United States and western Canada, from British Columbia and Montana south to California and New Mexico, with a few populations in the Black Hills of South Dakota and in western Nebraska, as well as in South America in the Andean valleys of Chile and Argentina.

It grows easily in alkaline and saline soils, and thrives on soils that are rich in calcium. It rapidly establishes in disturbed habitat, including burns, flooded washes, and rockslides, so it is a valuable shrub for revegetating damaged land such as overgrazed rangeland and abandoned mining areas.

Ecology
It is a larval host to the sagebrush checkerspot and it is an important nectar source in the fall. Range animals such as deer and antelope browse the foliage. It often occurs with Ericameria nauseosa.

References

External links
USDA Plants profile for Chrysothamnus viscidiflorus (yellow rabbitbrush)
CalFlora database: Chrysothamnus viscidiflorus (green rabbitbrush,  stickyleaf rabbitbrush, yellow rabbitbrush) — with subspecies links

NPIN−Lady Bird Johnson Wildflower Center: Chrysothamnus viscidiflorus
Flora of Eastern Washington and Adjacent Idaho: Chrysothamnus viscidiflorus
Southwest Colorado Wildflowers
Goldenweeds and Rabbitbrush Found East of the Cascade Mountains of Oregon and Washington: Chrysothamnus viscidiflorus ssp. lanceolatus — (green rabbitbrush, lanceleaf rabbitbrush, yellow rabbitbrush)
 University of California, Calphotos photo gallery — Chrysothamnus viscidiflorus

Astereae
Flora of the Northwestern United States
Flora of the North-Central United States
Flora of the Southwestern United States
Flora of Western Canada
Flora of the California desert regions
Flora of the Great Basin
Flora of the Sierra Nevada (United States)
Natural history of the Mojave Desert
Plants described in 1840
Taxa named by Thomas Nuttall
Flora without expected TNC conservation status